Deerlijk is a municipality located in the Belgian province of West Flanders. The municipality only comprises the town of Deerlijk proper. On January 1, 2006, Deerlijk had a total population of 11,310. The total area is 16.82 km² which gives a population density of 673 inhabitants per km².

References

External links

Official website  - Available only in Dutch

 
Municipalities of West Flanders